Ignacio Ortiz is a Mexican painter and teacher noted for his depictions of women and his work in the development of the fine arts program at the Universidad Autónoma de Nuevo León. He began his career at the same university as a student, with advanced studies in Europe. He has had individual and collective showings of his work in Mexico, the United States and various countries in Europe. He is a member of the Royal Union of Swedish Painters and the Salón de la Plástica Mexicana. In 2005, the Museo Metropolitano de Monterrey gave him an award for his life’s work and contributions to the culture of Monterrey.

Life
Ignacio Ortiz was born in La Piedad, Michoacán in 1934. He moved with his family to the city of Monterrey when he was twelve which is when he began to be interested in painting. When he was a teen a neighbor saw his small paintings and asked his father to allow him to enter classes at a local school. There he studied with a Spanish painter named Carmen Cortés and her husband. When he turned eighteen, he entered the fine arts program at the Universidad Autónoma de Nuevo León where he studied with José Guadalupe Ramírez, Jorge Rangel and Spanish painter Juan Eugenio Mingorance as one of the first students at the university’s nascent art program.

On the recommendation of Diego Rivera, David Alfaro Siqueiros and Pablo O'Higgins, he obtained a scholarship to study at the Escuela Nacional de Pintura, Escultura y Grabado "La Esmeralda" in Mexico City. These same painters help him and some other student start a small newspaper at the school. In 1957 he finished his studies in Mexico City and returned to Monterrey where he became a painting instructor at the fine arts program at the Universidad Autónoma de Nuevo León.

In 1968 he received a scholarship to study his masters at the Academy of Fine Arts, Prague from 1958 to 1960. In 1962 he returned to Mexico.

In 1968, he received another scholarship, this time for his doctorate in art history at the Uppsala University in Sweden. He lived and exhibited in Europe for a time, meeting Pablo Picasso at an exhibition in Paris. The Spanish painter invited him to his workshop in Vallauris, France shortly before Ortiz returned again to Mexico in 1971.

Since then, Ortiz has lived and worked as an artist in Mexico, where his work mostly centers on women.  His female friends have included Pita Amor, María Félix, Irma Serrano and Lola Beltrán. Amor dedicated some of her poems to his work.

He never plans to retire because he says that any day he does not paint feels like he died a little.

Career
During his career, he has exhibited his work individually and collectively in Mexico, the United States, Sweden, France, Czechoslovakia, Bulgaria, Germany, Austria, Belgium and Spain. His first exhibition was at the main hall of the Colegio Civil when he was a student, displayed alongside those of Gerardo Cantú and Marcos Cuellar.

Individual exhibitions include the Umprum Gallery in Prague (1959), Galería El Caracol in Mexico City  (1964), Galería Forma in Monterrey (1965), Upplans Gallery in Uppsala, Sweden (1969), a retrospective at the Konsthalien in Stockholm (1970), the Palacio de Gobierno in Monterrey (1971), Galería Gandhi in Mexico City (1973), Palacio de Bellas Artes (1976), Casa de Cultura in Oaxaca (1976), Oficina de Gobierno of Nuevo León (1979), Palacio Municipal of Monterrey  (1980), Casa de Cultura in Monterrey (1983), Galería Soutine (1990), retrospective at the Galería Arte AC (1994), the Salón de la Plástica Mexicana (1999, 2003), the Museo of Monterrey (2000), Salón Niza in Mexico City (2004, 2005, 2008), the Museo Metropolitano of Monterrey (2005), Pinacotheca of Nuevo León (2009) and the Exhibition Center of the Mexico City International Airport (2011) .

He has participated in collective exhibitions in Bratislava (1960), Mary Moore Gallery in La Joya, California (1974), Galería Artes y Libros in Monterrey and Museo de Arte Contemporáneo in Morelia (1976), several collective exhibitions in Sweden in 1987, Galería Soutine in Mexico City (1988), Galería Enrique Jiménez (1992), Galería Gilberto Mata (1993), Palacio de Bellas Artes (1994), Cruz Roja in Monterrey (1995), Museo Monterrey (1997), Salón de la Plástica Mexicana (1997, 1998, 2003), Centro Financiero Bancomer in Mexico City (2000), Museo Metropolitano of Monterrey (2005), Festival Internacional Cervantino (2007) and the Secretaría de Gobernación (2009) .

Another important aspect of his career has been in the teaching of art. After he finished his studies in Mexico City in 1957, he returned to Monterrey, where he became a painting instructor at the Universidad Autónoma de Nuevo León. After spending time in Europe, he returned to the same institution in 1962 as its director, restructuring the program. He has been an important part of the development of the fine arts program of the Universidad de Nuevo León, which is now the most important institution of its kind in the northeast of Mexico. In 1966 he also restructured the fine arts program at the Universidad Veracruzana as its director. In 1977, he began as instructor at the Escuela de Pintura y Escultura La Esmeralda.

Recognition for his work includes first place at the Salón de Noviembre de Arte in 1962, membership in the Royal Union of Swedish Painters since 1969 and an award at a drawing competition in Barcelona, Spain. He is also a member of the Salón de la Plástica Mexicana and in 2005, the Museo Metropolitano of Monterrey gave him an award for his life’s work and contributions to the culture of Monterrey in 2005.

Artistry
Ortiz is of the generation of Mexican painters of the second half of the 20th century, contemporary with Oscar Rodríguez Naranjo, Juan Manuel de la Rosa, Arnold Belkin, José Luis Serrano and Francisco Icaza. Much of his work focuses on depictions of women, with entire series dedicated to them such as “Las Divas” (The Divas).  He believer that women are central to art, literature and music and says he admires women, especially those of his family along with his women friends and his wife. He says that they are his muses which give him inspiration. His work of the latter 2000s has focused on depiction of women with clear allusion to the Cubism of Picasso, with women on geometric background and women figures in geometric style, both done in strong colors.

References

Mexican artists
1934 births
Living people
People from La Piedad
Artists from Michoacán
Escuela Nacional de Pintura, Escultura y Grabado "La Esmeralda" alumni